Toorawandi is a civil parish of Napier County in New South Wales.

The parish is on the junction of the Castlereagh River and Yallagal Creek and on the Ulamambri Creek.  The only town of the parish is Ulamambri, New South Wales and the nearest main town is Coonabarabran.

The parish was on the now closed Gwabegar railway line with stations at Ulamambri, and Deringulla to the south.

References

Localities in New South Wales
Geography of New South Wales